William Paterson (July 7, 1919 – September 3, 2003) was an actor in American regional theater who also appeared on television and in films.

Biography

Early life
William Paterson was born on July 7, 1919, in Buffalo, New York, to a Scottish-American father and an Irish-American mother. Raised a Catholic, Paterson's elementary education was at St. Mark's Parochial School. Eschewing a Catholic high school, Paterson had a short, unhappy stint at Bennett High School, before attending and graduating from the private Nichols School, where he was introduced to acting in his senior year. In 1941, he graduated from Brown University, with honors in English literature. He then served four years in the US army, earning a Bronze Star and Purple Heart in Europe as a staff officer with the 110th Infantry Regiment during World War II.

Career
In 1947, after his army service, Paterson joined The Cleveland Play House, a repertory company, where he stayed for twenty years. He spent summers performing with this company at the Chautauqua Institution. Occasionally, he would appear on live television, in films, and touring nationally with his own one-man biographical shows.

In 1967, Paterson joined San Francisco's American Conservatory Theater (ACT), where he stayed for the next thirty years, until his retirement in 1998, becoming well known for his portrayal of Ebenezer Scrooge in Charles Dickens's A Christmas Carol.

Personal life
In 1943, Paterson married Patricia Best, a marriage that lasted until shortly after the war. In 1951, Paterson married Cora Beams, a marriage that ended with her death in 1993. He served nine years on the San Francisco Arts Commission and two years as a trustee of ACT. He twice worked as Senator Dianne Feinstein's campaign treasurer when she was at City Hall. His autobiography, Solid seasons: My 45 years at two resident theatres and what generations of critics made of them, was published in 1997.

Selected stage work

Cleveland
 The Caine Mutiny Court-Martial (1954–55) – Lt. Barney Greenwald
 Much Ado About Nothing (1955–56) – Benedick
 Tiger at the Gates (1956–57) – Hector

San Francisco
 Long Day's Journey Into Night (1967–68) – James Tyrone Sr.
 A Christmas Carol (1976–77) – Ebenezer Scrooge
 Saint Joan (1988–89) – Bishop of Beauvais

Selected film and TV appearances
 The F.B.I. – "The Savage Wilderness" (1970; Season 6, Episode 5) – Dr. Sharpe
 Dirty Harry (1971) – Judge Bannerman
 Bonanza – "Riot" (1972; Season 14, Episode 4) – Mr. Vannerman
 The Waltons – "The Separation" (1973; Season 2, Episode 3) – Oglethorpe 'Fred' Hansen
 At Long Last Love (1975) – Murray (Poker Party)
 The Taming of the Shrew (1976 TV broadcast) – Baptista
 Hear No Evil (1982 made-for-TV-Movie) – Minister
 Hard Traveling (1986) – Sheriff
 Pacific Heights (1990) – Mr. Hill (final film role)

Citations

Works cited

External links
 
 
 
 

1919 births
2003 deaths
Male actors from Buffalo, New York
Brown University alumni
Burials at Forest Lawn Cemetery (Buffalo)